The basalt wheatear (Oenanthe warriae) is a bird, a species of wheatear found in Jordan and Syria. It is a small passerine in a group formerly classed as members of the thrush family Turdidae, but now more generally considered to be part of the Old World flycatcher family Muscicapidae.

The basalt wheatear (O. warriae) and Maghreb wheatear (O. halophila) were formerly considered subspecies of the mourning wheatear, but were split as distinct species by the IOC in 2021.

References

External links

Species page on Israeli birds website

Wheatears
Birds of the Middle East
Birds described in 2011